In mathematics, the Ramanujan conjecture, due to , states that Ramanujan's tau function given by the Fourier coefficients  of the cusp form  of weight 

where , satisfies

when  is a prime number.

Ramanujan L-function 
The Riemann zeta function and the Dirichlet L-function satisfy the Euler product,

and due to their completely multiplicative property

Are there L-functions other than the Riemann zeta function and the Dirichlet L-functions satisfying the above relations? Indeed, the L-functions of automorphic forms satisfy the Euler product (1) but they do not satisfy (2) because they do not have the completely multiplicative property. However, Ramanujan discovered that the L-function of the modular discriminant satisfies the modified relation

where  is Ramanujan's tau function. The term

is thought of as the difference from the completely multiplicative property. The above L-function is called Ramanujan's L-function.

Ramanujan conjecture
Ramanujan conjectured the following:
 is multiplicative,
.

 

would have always imaginary roots from many examples. The relationship between roots and coefficients of quadratic equations leads the third relation, called Ramanujan's conjecture.

which looks like the Riemann Hypothesis.

In 1917, L. Mordell proved the first two relations using techniques from complex analysis, specifically what are now known as Hecke operators. The formulations required to show that it was a consequence were delicate, and not at all obvious. The existence of the connection inspired some of the deep work in the late 1960s when the consequences of the étale cohomology theory were being worked out.

Ramanujan–Petersson conjecture for modular forms
For any modular form

one can form the Dirichlet series

Since  is a modular form of weight ,  turns out to be an entire and  satisfies the functional equation:

this was proved by Wilton in 1929.

In the case  Hans Petersson introduced a metric on the space of modular forms, called the Petersson metric (also see Weil-Petersson metric). This conjecture was named after him. Under the Petersson metric it is shown that we can define the orthogonality on the space of modular forms as the space of cusp forms and its orthogonal space and they have finite dimensions. Furthermore, we can concretely calculate the dimension of the space of holomorphic modular forms, using the Riemann–Roch theorem (see the dimensions of modular forms).

 used the Eichler–Shimura isomorphism to reduce the Ramanujan conjecture to the Weil conjectures that he later proved.　The more general Ramanujan–Petersson conjecture for holomorphic cusp forms in the theory of elliptic modular forms for congruence subgroups has a similar formulation, with exponent  where  is the weight of the form.

The Ramanujan–Petersson conjecture for Maass forms is still open (as of 2022) because Deligne's method, which works well in the holomorphic case, does not work in the real analytic case.

Ramanujan–Petersson conjecture for automorphic forms
Another way of saying this is that the local components of cusp forms should be tempered. However, several authors found counter-examples for anisotropic groups where the component at infinity was not tempered.  and  showed that the conjecture was also false even for some quasi-split and split groups, by constructing automorphic forms for the unitary group  and the symplectic group  that are non-tempered almost everywhere, related to the representation .

After the counterexamples were found,  suggested that a reformulation of the conjecture should still hold. The current formulation of the generalized Ramanujan conjecture is for a globally generic cuspidal automorphic representation of a connected reductive group, where the generic assumption means that the representation admits a Whittaker model. It states that each local component of such a representation should be tempered. It is an observation due to Langlands that establishing functoriality of symmetric powers of automorphic representations of  will give a proof of the Ramanujan–Petersson conjecture.

Bounds towards Ramanujan over number fields
Obtaining the best possible bounds towards the generalized Ramanujan conjecture in the case of number fields has caught the attention of many mathematicians. Each improvement is considered a milestone in the world of modern number theory.

The Bernstein–Zelevinsky classification tells us that each p-adic  can be obtained via unitary parabolic induction from a representation

with  tempered. Given , a Ramanujan bound is a number  such that

Langlands classification can be used for the archimedean places. The generalized Ramanujan conjecture is equivalent to the bound .

The Ramanujan-Petersson conjecture over global function fields
Via a different technique that extends the Langlands-Shahidi method to include global function fields,  proves the Ramanujan conjecture for the classical groups.

Applications
An application of the Ramanujan conjecture is the explicit construction of Ramanujan graphs by Lubotzky, Phillips and Sarnak. Indeed, the name "Ramanujan graph" was derived from this connection. Another application is that the Ramanujan–Petersson conjecture for the general linear group  implies Selberg's conjecture about eigenvalues of the Laplacian for some discrete groups.

References

 Reprinted in 

Modular forms
Zeta and L-functions
Srinivasa Ramanujan
Conjectures